The 2018 Men's EuroHockey Club Trophy was the 42nd edition of the men's EuroHockey Club Trophy, Europe's secondary club field hockey tournament organized by the European Hockey Federation. It was held from 18 to 21 May 2018 at Wiener AC in Vienna, Austria.

Grange won their first title by defeating OKS Vinnitsa 5–2 in the final. Minsk won the bronze medal by defeating the defending champions Rotweiss Wettingen 5–3.

Qualified teams
The following eight teams with the following seeding participated in the tournament.

 AZS AWF Poznań
 Bra
 Rotweiss Wettingen
 Grange
 Minsk
 WAC
 OKS Vinnitsa
 Stroitel Brest

Preliminary round

Pool A

Pool B

Classification round

Seventh place game

Fifth place game

Third place game

Final

Final standings
 Grange
 OKS Vinnitsa
 Minsk
 Rotweiss Wettingen
 Stroitel Brest
 WAC
 AZS AWF Poznań
 Bra

See also
2017–18 Euro Hockey League
2018 Women's EuroHockey Club Trophy

References

Men's EuroHockey Club Trophy
Club Trophy
International field hockey competitions hosted by Austria
EuroHockey Club Trophy
Sports competitions in Vienna
EuroHockey Club Trophy
2010s in Vienna